Gap junction alpha-4 protein, also known as Connexin-37 or Cx37, is a protein that in humans is encoded by the GJA4 gene.  This protein, like other Connexin proteins, forms connections between cells known as gap junctions. Connexin 37 can be found in many tissues including the ovary, heart, and kidney.

References

Further reading 

 
 
 
 
 
 
 
 
 
 
 
 
 
 
 
 

Connexins